Thirteen policemen and soldiers were killed on Saturday night March 20, 2016 in an attack that targeted a security checkpoint in Sinai's Al-Arish. The Ministry of Interior announced that a mortar attack targeted Al-Safa checkpoint, killing two police officers, a policeman and 10 soldiers.

See also
 October 2014 Sinai attacks
 July 2015 Sinai attacks
 Sinai insurgency
 List of terrorist incidents, January–June 2016

References

21st-century mass murder in Egypt
Attacks on police stations in the 2010s
ISIL terrorist incidents in Egypt
Islamic terrorist incidents in 2016
North Sinai Governorate
Mass murder in 2016
Sinai insurgency
Terrorist incidents in Egypt in 2016
Terrorist incidents in the Sinai Peninsula